Stuart Stone (born Stuart Eisenstein; November 17, 1980) is a Canadian actor as well as a producer of television, film and music. He is best known for his roles as Ronald Fisher in the 2001 cult film, Donnie Darko and Ralphie Tennelli on The Magic School Bus animated television series from 1994 to 1997. Stone has also toured as a comedian and rapper.

Early life
Stone was born Stuart Eisenstein in Thornhill, Ontario. He attended Thornlea Secondary School. His parents ran a franchise selling hockey and baseball cards. After graduating high school, he moved to Los Angeles, California to continue his career in acting.

Career
He started his acting career at age two, appearing in Canadian TV commercials such as Maple Leaf Foods Ham  and Kraft Dinner as a child actor in Toronto. He made his major motion picture debut in Heavenly Bodies as Joey, Samantha Blair's son played by Cynthia Dale, in 1985. Since then, he has guest-starred in many TV series such as Goosebumps, Boston Public, and Flash Forward. He starred in animated features such as Babar: The Movie and The Magic School Bus  as a voice-over actor. He has also done voice-over work for Care Bears and voices both main characters in the Canadian cartoon Carl Squared. He also had roles in the films Donnie Darko and The Boys Club.

In 2006, Stone and actor-comedian (and also close friend) Jamie Kennedy starred together in the MTV reality show Blowin' Up, which showed the journey the two went through to create a hit rap album and "blowin' up". After the show aired its finale, the album Stone and Kennedy created was released, which was titled Blowin' Up to correspond with their reality series, and both also appeared on the MTV show True Love. The album featured guest appearances from Houston rapper Paul Wall and Bay Area rapper E-40, as well as actors Bob Saget and Jason Biggs.

Stone has been known to tour off and on with Kennedy on his stand-up tours, performing songs from the Blowin' Up album, as well as the song "The Left One", featured on Kennedy's Unwashed album. Shows on this variety are routinely opened by comedian Bill Dawes, and at times have had guests, such as Saget at a November 17, 2006, Las Vegas show.

Stu hosted his own show, "The Sunday Nite Stu", which was originally broadcast online through Stickam webcasts. His show aired Sundays at 9 PM PST drawing in over 300 thousand viewers monthly. He brought along a variety of guest stars and anyone with a Stickam account could join his live room and watch or even get a chance to chat with him. The show was the first ever on the Stickam site and in 2012, "Sunday Nite Stu" celebrated over 10 million viewers! Recent guests included Colt Cabana, The Last Goodnight, Paul Wall, Young Church, Elliott Yamin, Kaz James, Jared McMullin, Andy Milonakis, and Chester French.

Stu Stone's TSM RADIO podcast continues to be one of the most listened to on the net. Stu's interviews often give a chance for fans to hear their favourite artists and actors speak in a more "candid" fashion. Guests have included Tila Tequila, Perez Hilton, Jason Wahler, Talan Torriero, Elliott Yamin, Bonnie McKee, Everlast (musician), Lucy Walsh, Dennis Haskins, Rohan Marley, Edward Furlong, Flower Tucci, Chyna, Kendra Jade, Christy Hemme, Diamond Dallas Page, Bobby Lee, Cisco Adler, and many others.

Stu Stone worked as the producer of magician Criss Angel's television series. He also produced "Criss Angel: Loyal Saturday" and "Criss Angel: Live Wire" broadcasts.

Stu Stone performs regularly on the weekly pro-wrestling series "Championship Wrestling From Hollywood". Stone handles commentary on the broadcast as well as performing alongside his stable of wrestlers: The Family Stone.

Stone along with his business partner and brother-in-law Adam Rodness formed the company 5'7 films. Stone served as director and co-writer on the film The Haunted House On Kirby Road, which won best horror feature at the Toronto Independent Film Festival. Stu Stone also won best director for the film at the CineView film festival. 5'7 films has announced a second feature with Breakthrough entertainment which will once again put Stone in the director's chair. Another horror film revolving around Scarecrows. The company also has said they will be releasing a documentary feature on the world of baseball cards.

Stone and Rodness appear in the music video for the song "Falling Back" by Drake (musician), appearing as members of The Dan Band during a wedding scene. 

Stone, along with a group known as Legal Banter, recently pioneered the sports jersey reveal party. This innovative jersey exchange turned social event honours oft-forgotten 1970s-2000s sports heroes, while enabling safe adherence to COVID-19 distancing restrictions.

Filmography

Film

Television

Video game roles
Palace Pets App - Sundrop

Director

 2016: The Haunted House on Kirby Road
 2017: Scarecrows
 2018: Jack of all Trades
 2019: The Thrillusionists
 2020: Faking a Murderer
 2022: Vandits

Awards and nominations

Canadian Awards for the Electronic and Animated Arts (CAEAA)

Discography

Albums

Singles
 "Save the Gingers (Red Head Woman)" (2010)   
 "Super Bird" (2011) 
 "Kid On X-Mas" feat Jamie Kennedy (2011) 

As featured performer
Kaz James, Sony BMG, 2008
(from James' debut solo album If They Knew) 
 "Breathe" – written and produced by Stu Stone and Kaz James
 "Subwoofers in the Neighborhood" – written and produced by Stu Stone and Kaz James

Videography

Jamie Kennedy & Stu Stone

Stu Stone

R.O.T.N.

See also
 Jamie Kennedy's Blowin' Up

References

External links
 

1980 births
Canadian male voice actors
Living people
Canadian male child actors
Male actors from Ontario
People from Thornhill, Ontario
Jewish Canadian musicians
Canadian male rappers
Musicians from Ontario
Canadian male television actors
Jewish Canadian male actors
Canadian male comedians
21st-century Canadian male musicians
21st-century Canadian rappers